Hong Kong Localism Power (HKLP), formerly called Hong Kong Nativism Power, was an internet-based localist political organisation formed in March 2011. It advocated the protection of the values and culture of Hong Kong people in the face of the growing influences of mainland China and the influx of mainland immigrants in Hong Kong after the handover of Hong Kong to China in 1997. The group was dissolved in January 2012.

Platform
Members of the organisation participated in a major anti-government rally on 6 March 2011 which received media attention. They opposed a demand from new immigrant support groups for inclusion of non-Hong Kong permanent residents in a government HK$6,000 cash handout.  The participants also called for a revision of immigration policy.

References

2011 establishments in Hong Kong
2012 disestablishments in Hong Kong
Anti-immigration politics in Hong Kong
Defunct political parties in Hong Kong
Localist parties in Hong Kong